Melbury Abbas is a village and civil parish in north Dorset, England, 3 km SSW of the town of Shaftesbury, east of the A350 Shaftesbury to Blandford Forum road.

Local Features 

Melbury Abbas is on the western edge of Cranborne Chase in hilly terrain.  

Melbury Hill (256 metres ASL) is 1 km WSW of the village, Breeze Hill (262 metres ASL) is 2 km to the east of the village.  

The grass airfield of Compton Abbas (247 metres ASL) is 2 km to the SE of the village.

History 
In 1086 Melbury Abbas was recorded in the Domesday Book as Meleberie. 

It was in Sixpenny Hundred and had 47 households, 12 ploughlands and 4 mills.

The lord and tenant-in-chief was Shaftesbury Abbey.

The Village Today 
In the 2011 census the civil parish (CP) had 147 dwellings.  The CP includes West Melbury and part of Cann Common.  134 households and a population of 305.

Church of St Thomas   
This is on the south side of the village and as well as a square tower at the south west end, has a large spire mounted on the SW corner of the top of the tower.  

The original stone church of Norman times had a tower with three bells, at least one transept, and a west door. It survived until 1852 when it was in poor condition and was demolished.

The present church is said to cost Sir Richard Glyn £2500.00.  At this time Sir Richard owned most of the village. On 21 December 1852 the Bishop of Salisbury dedicated the new church to St Thomas, whose feast day it was.

Road Connections 
Melbury Abbas village is on an unclassified road that follows a hilltop route roughly parallel to the A350 primary route that passes west of the village between Shaftesbury and Blandford. The A350 follows a lower route through villages in the Blackmore Vale.  However, much traffic uses the hilltop route as an alternative because it is straighter and passes through fewer villages. Melbury Abbas is the only bottleneck on this road, where it dips down into the valley and becomes narrower. 

Dorset County Council have considered bypass schemes, but none has got further than preliminary because Melbury Abbas village is surrounded by conservation land.

References

External links 

Villages in Dorset